Lo Kuo-hua (born 28 October 1992) is a Taiwanese baseball Pitcher for the Fubon Guardians of the Chinese Professional Baseball League (CPBL). He previously played for the Minnesota Twins farm system from 2012–2016 and with the Lincoln Saltdogs of the American Association of Independent Professional Baseball in 2016 and with the Kōchi Fighting Dogs in the Shikoku Island League Plus.

Career

Minnesota Twins
On June 10, 2011, Lo signed with the Minnesota Twins as an international free agent. He began his career in 2012 with the Rookie-level GCL Twins, pitching to a 2-0 record with a 1.13 ERA in 6 starts. He spent the 2013, 2014, and 2015 with the Rookie-level Elizabethton Twins, pitching to a cumulative 9-2 record with 9 saves in 53 appearances. In 2015, he had a 1.44 ERA with 43 strikeouts in 31.1 innings pitched. Lo was assigned to the Single-A Cedar Rapids Kernels for the 2016 season. On August 4, 2016, Lo was released.

Lincoln Saltdogs
On August 7, 2016, Lo signed with the Lincoln Saltdogs of the American Association of Independent Professional Baseball. Lo allowed 2 runs in 3.0 innings pitched for the Saltdogs over 3 appearances. He was released on October 19, 2016.

Fubon Guardians
Lo signed with the Fubon Guardians of the Chinese Professional Baseball League for the 2017 season. In 75 appearances for Fubon through the 2020 season, Lo pitched to a 6.22 ERA with 60 strikeouts in 72.1 innings pitched.

International career
Lo represented Taiwan at the 2010 World Junior Baseball Championship, 2014 Asian Games, 2015 Asian Baseball Championship, 2015 WBSC Premier12 and 2017 World Baseball Classic.

References

External links 

1992 births
Living people
Asian Games medalists in baseball
Asian Games silver medalists for Chinese Taipei
Baseball pitchers
Baseball players at the 2014 Asian Games
Cedar Rapids Kernels players
Elizabethton Twins players
Fubon Guardians players
Gulf Coast Twins players
Kōchi Fighting Dogs players
Lincoln Saltdogs players
Medalists at the 2014 Asian Games
People from Chiayi
Taiwanese expatriate baseball players in Japan
Taiwanese expatriate baseball players in the United States
2017 World Baseball Classic players
Wei Chuan Dragons players